Jon Button (born February 10, 1971) is an American bass player born in Fairbanks, Alaska, and based in Los Angeles, California.  Button has played on commercial, film and television scores and toured with a number of well-known artists.  He plays both electric and upright string bass.

Biography
Jon Button was born into a musical family in Fairbanks, Alaska. The youngest of five siblings, Button started learning piano at age four, and bass at seven.  During his teen years, he played in jazz and blues bands and with local symphonies and orchestras.  In high school, Button won music scholarships and later attended the University of North Texas' music program.

Button moved to Los Angeles in 1994 and found work playing on film and television scores, including the Emmy Award winning Batman Beyond. He has played on a number of recordings, including Borrowed Heaven by the Corrs and Tour Fijación Oral by Shakira. He has performed live and toured with such well-known artists as Michelle Branch, Rachael Yamagata, Mandy Moore, Shakira, Sheryl Crow, Roger Daltrey and  The Who.  Button also played at the musical benefit Live 8 and played upright bass with The Who during an acoustic concert associated with The Who's Super Bowl performance.

In 2009, Button toured as bassist in Roger Daltrey's band for the Use It or Lose It tour. The band also opened for Eric Clapton during several dates in 2010, and scheduled more tour dates for 2012. He is currently playing on tour with The Who to replace Pino Palladino.

Button has been married to actress Terryn Westbrook since 2011. They have one child.

Discography
 Batman Beyond – Original Soundtrack (1999)
 Batman Beyond: Return of the Joker – Original Soundtrack (2000)
 Loud on Earth – Daniel Cage (2000)
 A Place to Land – Dakota Moon (2002)
 Identity Crisis – Shelby Lynne (2003)
 Chapter 2 – Jessica Jacobs (2003)
 Valhalla – Emily Richards (2003)
 Borrowed Heaven – The Corrs (2004)
 Como Me Acuerdo – Robi Draco Rosa (2004)
 Freedom – Kristy Frank (2006)
 Metta – Yogi (2006)
 Tour Fijación Oral – Shakira (2007)
 Talking To Me – Jeremy Kay (2007)
 Bonfires – Kirk Wheeler (2007)
 Earning Her Wings – Angela Easterling (2007)
 Soul on Ten – Robben Ford (2009)
 Life Is Not a Snapshot – Josh Wilson (2009)
 Electricidad – Jesse & Joy (2009)
 Soy – Ednita Nazario (2009)
 Lover & a Fighter – Devil Doll (2020)

References

External links
 jonbutton.com
 Jon Button's page at Artist Direct
 The Who Official Website
 Jon Button plays with The Who

1971 births
American rock bass guitarists
American rock double-bassists
Male double-bassists
Living people
People from Fairbanks, Alaska
University of North Texas College of Music alumni
No Plan B (band) members
Guitarists from Los Angeles
American male bass guitarists
21st-century double-bassists
21st-century American bass guitarists
21st-century American male musicians
The Who members